An ice cap or icecap is a geographical feature.

Icecap may also refer to

 Raleigh IceCaps, a defunct ECHL Hockey Team
 St. John's IceCaps, a team in the American Hockey League
 IceCap Zone, a level from the 1994 video game Sonic the Hedgehog 3
 Hypothermia cap, medical device to cool the human scalp

See also
 "Ice Capp", Tim Horton's "iced cappuccino", see Cappuccino#Iced cappuccino
 Polar ice cap
 Ice cap climate
 Ice field
 Ice sheet
 Glacier
 Snow cap (disambiguation)